Sarah Agnes James (born 1946) is a native Neets'aii Gwich'in from Arctic Village, Alaska, USA, and a board member of the International Indian Treaty Council. She was awarded the Goldman Environmental Prize in 2002, together with Jonathon Solomon and Norma Kassi. They received the prize for their efforts to protect the Arctic National Wildlife Refuge (ANWR) from plans of oil exploration and drilling. Oil and gas exploration would disturb the life cycle of the Porcupine caribou, which has been a foundation for the Gwich'in culture since approximately 18,000 BC.

Politics and lobbying
In November 1969, James joined a group of indigenous students led by Mohawk activist Richard Oakes that occupied the former prison island Alcatraz in San Francisco, CA.

In the 1990s James visited communities in South American countries (Brazil, Ecuador, Nicaragua, and Guatemala), speaking for the underprivileged. She also appeared on television programs (CNN, MacNeil-Lehrer, CBS). And she traveled to Washington, trying to clear up concepts that they believe petroleum companies misrepresent, and speaking for preservation of the Arctic National Wildlife Refuge.

Honors and awards 
In 1993, she was awarded the Alston Bannerman Fellowship. In 2001 she received the "Leadership for a Changing World" grant awarded for outstanding but little known leaders. In 2002 she was awarded the Goldman Environmental Prize for "grassroots environmentalists along with Jonathon Solomon Sr., and Norma Kassi. She also received the National Conservation Land Trust Award in 2002. In 2004, she received the "Ecotrust Award for Indigenous Leadership", and in 2006 she earned the Alaska Conservation Foundation "Celia Hunter Award for Outstanding Conservations".

References

1946 births
Living people
20th-century Native American women
20th-century Native Americans
21st-century Native American women
21st-century Native Americans
Alaskan Athabaskan people
Alaska Native activists
American environmentalists
American women environmentalists
Goldman Environmental Prize awardees
Gwich'in people
Native American environmentalists
Native American women in politics
Women in Alaska politics